Micky Droy (born 7 May 1951 in Highbury, London) is an English former footballer who played in the Football League during the 1970s and 1980s, spending 15 years with Chelsea but also playing for Luton Town, Crystal Palace and Brentford.

Playing career
Droy was a tall and generally uncompromising defender. He played for Chelsea during a particularly turbulent period of the club's history, and was a part of the sides which were relegated to the Second Division in 1974–75, promoted back to the First Division in 1976–77, relegated again in 1978–79 and then promoted again in 1983–84. A feature on The Times' website summed him up as "six feet four inches of hard-core centre back, who had an unsentimental way with a headed clearance and who, from 1971, gave 15 years of no-nonsense service to a mortifyingly declining side." He was Chelsea's Player of the Year in 1978.

After a brief loan spell with Luton Town, Droy left Chelsea in March 1985, joined Crystal Palace on a free transfer, then joined  Brentford, before moving back to non-league football initially with Dulwich Hamlet and then for several years with Kingstonian, where he was appointed assistant manager in September 1994, before being appointed manager later in the month. Droy was removed from his post on 7 January 1995. Droy later played for Chelmsford Sunday League club Priory Sports under Garry Hill, alongside former internationals Alan Brazil and Paul Parker.

Post-playing career
He ran a successful electrical business and moved to Florida.

References

External links
 

1951 births
Living people
People from Highbury
English footballers
Association football defenders
Slough Town F.C. players
Chelsea F.C. players
Luton Town F.C. players
Crystal Palace F.C. players
Brentford F.C. players
Dulwich Hamlet F.C. players
Kingstonian F.C. players
English Football League players
English football managers
Arsenal F.C. players
Hoddesdon Town F.C. players